"Miracles" is a song written by Marty Balin and originally recorded by Jefferson Starship, appearing on its 1975 album Red Octopus.

"Miracles" peaked at number 3 for three weeks on the Billboard Hot 100, making it the highest-charting single the band ever recorded under the name Jefferson Starship or its previous incarnation Jefferson Airplane.

Background and writing
The song was inspired in part by the Indian guru Sathya Sai Baba, whose followers believe him to have been a miracle worker. It was also inspired in part by a woman Balin was in love with at the time. According to Jeff Tamarkin's book Got a Revolution! The Turbulent Flight of Jefferson Airplane, Balin labored over the song "for some time" and "slowly but deliberately crafted" it. However, author Robert Yehling has written that Balin wrote the song in 30 minutes or wrote the lyrics in 45 minutes. According to Balin, when he presented the song to the rest of the band members, "Everybody went, 'I don't know about that. That's pretty weird, man.' I was really worried; nobody liked it. But I told myself, after about five days, 'Maybe they're wrong.'"

In order to secure more radio airplay for the song, the full-length album version of "Miracles" (6 minutes, 52 seconds long) was cut by more than half its length for the single, which was released at a length of 3 minutes, 25 seconds. This edit was done not only for length, but to remove the sexual reference in the line "I had a taste of the real world when I went down on you, girl."

Critical reception
Commenting on the band's recording of "Miracles", Jeff Tamarkin wrote: "[Larry] Cox nailed the production -- there isn't a wasted, out of place note. Strings glisten, the keyboard sound is contemporary and Grace [Slick] and Paul [Kantner]'s harmonies are relatively traditional. [David] Freiberg came up with the memorable signature organ riff that opens the song and Craig [Chaquico] with a fresh supply of delicious guitar sounds. Marty is at his most open, crooning his words of love like he hasn't in years -- without a hint of irony or awkwardness he uses the word 'baby' at least 25 times ...."

Upon the single's release, Billboard magazine listed "Miracles" among its Top Single Picks, indicating that the review panel predicted it to reach the top 30 of the Hot 100. The magazine commented, "With a top 10 LP under their belts, the rejuvenated Starship (with Marty Balin back as a full fledged member) come up with the kind of easy rocker that highlighted the early Airplane days. Vocal interchanges between Balin and Grace Slick the high point of the record."  Cash Box said it is "a fine, well-orchestrated love ballad in the Airplane tradition" and "some of their most appealing, well-produced material in years."

Reviewing a Balin solo concert in 1981, New York Times critic Stephen Holden referred to "Miracles" as Balin's "little masterpiece of pop pillow talk".

Dave Marsh and James Bernard listed "Miracles" among the "Best Songs to Pass the Censor" in The New Book of Rock Lists. In the same book, they also described "I had a taste of the real world / When I went down on you, girl" as the "Most Off-Color Line in the LP Version of a Number One Hit" (although "Miracles" did not, in fact, hit #1).

In 1998, Balin received a plaque from Broadcast Music Incorporated, a performing rights organization which monitors music performances on radio and elsewhere, recognizing that "Miracles" had achieved 2 million performances.

William Ruhlmann, writing in All Music Guide Required Listening: Classic Rock, commented, "[T]here can be little doubt that it was Balin's irresistible ballad 'Miracles,' the biggest hit single in the Jefferson Whatever catalog, that propelled Red Octopus to the top of the charts .... This must have been sweet vindication for Balin, who founded Jefferson Airplane but then drifted away from the group as it veered away from his musical vision. Now, the collective was incorporating his taste without quite integrating it -- 'Miracles,' with its strings and sax solo by nonband member Irv Cox, was hardly a characteristic Airplane/Starship track."

The New Rolling Stone Album Guide, published in 2004, stated that "with Marty Balin's 'Miracles,' Octopus′s massive hit, the band began shifting toward schmaltz. Balin now sounded like a lounge singer ...."

Philip Dodd, in The Book of Rock: From the 1950s to Today, described "Miracles" as "magnificent".

Soundtracks
The song has been featured in the films The Family Stone (2005), Crank (2006), and the TV series Supernatural (Season 6, Episode 19, 2011).

Personnel 

 Marty Balin – lead and backing vocals
 Grace Slick – backing vocals
 Paul Kantner – backing vocals, rhythm guitar
 Craig Chaquico – lead guitar, backing vocals
 Papa John Creach – electric violin
 David Freiberg – organ, backing vocals
 Pete Sears – bass, electric piano, backing vocals
 John Barbata – drums, percussion, backing vocals 

Additional personnel

 Bobbye Hall – percussion, congas
 Irv Cox – saxophone

Chart performance

Weekly charts

Year-end charts

Cover versions
Balin released a new version on his 1999 solo album, Marty Balin Greatest Hits.

References

External links
 

1975 songs
1975 singles
Rock ballads
Songs written by Marty Balin
Jefferson Starship songs
RCA Records singles